Roberto Pangaro (born 6 July 1950) is a retired Italian freestyle swimmer. He competed at the 1972 and 1976 Olympics in several 100 m and 200 events and reached the final in the 4 × 200 m freestyle relay in 1976. Pangaro was part of the Italian 4 × 100 m freestyle relay teams that won a bronze medal at the 1975 World Championships and a silver at the 1977 European Championships.

References

1950 births
Living people
Sportspeople from Trieste
Italian male swimmers
Italian male freestyle swimmers
Olympic swimmers of Italy
Swimmers at the 1972 Summer Olympics
Swimmers at the 1976 Summer Olympics
World Aquatics Championships medalists in swimming
European Aquatics Championships medalists in swimming

Mediterranean Games gold medalists for Italy
Mediterranean Games silver medalists for Italy
Mediterranean Games bronze medalists for Italy
Swimmers at the 1971 Mediterranean Games
Swimmers at the 1975 Mediterranean Games
Mediterranean Games medalists in swimming
20th-century Italian people